Charles Baring Wall (1795 – 14 October 1853) was at various stages throughout the 19th century the Member of Parliament for Guildford, Wareham, Weymouth and Salisbury. Wall was initially a Conservative but shifted to the Whigs as an MP for Guildford. He then belonged to the Peelite faction and died while MP for Salisbury.

He was the son of the banker Charles Wall and the religious enthusiast Harriet Baring. His maternal grandfather was Francis Baring, 1st Baronet. He was educated at Eton College and Christ Church, Oxford.

Wall did not marry. In 1833 he was placed on trial for an indecent assault on John Palmer, a police constable. Wall was acquitted, and Palmer forced to resign, one newspaper subsequently printing: "a man in an inferior station in life, is a ruined man, if he dare to accuse one of higher degree of an immoral crime."

His property included the Norman Court estate, straddling the Hampshire/Wiltshire border.

References

1795 births
1853 deaths
People educated at Eton College
Alumni of Christ Church, Oxford
Conservative Party (UK) MPs for English constituencies
Members of Parliament for Salisbury
Tory MPs (pre-1834)
UK MPs 1818–1820
UK MPs 1820–1826
UK MPs 1826–1830
UK MPs 1830–1831
UK MPs 1831–1832
UK MPs 1832–1835
UK MPs 1835–1837
UK MPs 1837–1841
UK MPs 1847–1852
UK MPs 1852–1857
Whig (British political party) MPs for English constituencies

Committee members of the Society for the Diffusion of Useful Knowledge